Heart Made Up on You is the third EP by American pop rock band R5. It was released on July 22, 2014 through Hollywood Records. Musically, is described as dance-pop with EDM elements.

Background
The band described Heart Made Up on You as a "first taste" of their upcoming second studio album, set to be released in spring 2015. However, due to further production and revisions, Ross Lynch announced in a radio interview that the band has decided these songs will not appear on the album, because they wanted a "blank slate".

Track listing

Reception
Heart Made Up on You received positive reviews from critics. Rachel Ho of Musichel, praised the band for creating "a sound indigenous to R5". She also added that "with Heart Made Up on You, R5 have once again evinced that they have the magical music touch that will continue taking them to the top." Vivian Pham of Popdust gave the album a rating of 4 out of 5 stars, saying that "R5 always leaves us wanting more." Verity Magazine's Nikole Renee said that the EP "shows a definite growth".

Charts

Release history

References

R5 (band) albums
2014 EPs
Hollywood Records EPs